{{DISPLAYTITLE:C10H14N2O}}
The molecular formula C10H14N2O (molar mass: 178.23 g/mol, exact mass: 178.1106 u) may refer to:

 Bupicomide
 Epiboxidine
 Nikethamide